Salem Chapel Township is one of fifteen townships in Forsyth County, North Carolina, United States. The township had a population of 6,808 according to the 2010 census.

Geographically, Salem Chapel Township occupies  in northern Forsyth County.  Portions of the town of Walkertown are in Salem Chapel Township.

References

Townships in Forsyth County, North Carolina
Townships in North Carolina